There are over 30 lakes named Mud Lake within the U.S. state of New York.

 Mud Lake, Chautauqua County, New York.	
 Laurel Lake, also known as Mud Lake, Delaware County, New York.	
 Mud Lake, Delaware County, New York.	
 Mud Lake, Delaware County, New York.	
 Mud Lake, Delaware County, New York.	
 Mud Pond, also known as Mud Lake, Franklin County, New York.	
 Mud Lake, Fulton County, New York.	
 Mud Lake, Fulton County, New York.	
 Mud Lake, Fulton County, New York.	
 Mud Lake, Fulton County, New York.	
 Mud Lake, Hamilton County, New York.	
 Mud Lake, Hamilton County, New York.	
 Mud Lake, Hamilton County, New York.	
 Mud Lake, Hamilton County, New York.	
 Mud Lake, Hamilton County, New York.	
 Mud Lake, Herkimer County, New York.	
 Mud Lake, Herkimer County, New York.	
 Mud Lake, Herkimer County, New York.	
 Clear Lake, also known as Mud Lake, Jefferson County, New York.	
 Mud Lake, Jefferson County, New York.	
 Mud Lake, Lewis County, New York.	
 Mud Lake, Onondaga County, New York.	
 Mud Lake, Otsego County, New York. Otsego County, New York. 
 Mud Lake, Putnam County, New York.	
 Mud Lake, Rensselaer County, New York.	
 Mud Lake, Schoharie County, New York.	
 Lamoka Lake, also known as Mud Lake, Schuyler County, New York.	
 Mud Lake, St. Lawrence County, New York.	
 Mud Lake, St. Lawrence County, New York.	
 Mud Lake, Steuben County, New York.	
 Mud Lake, Steuben County, New York.	
 Harrisburg Lake, also known as Mud Lake, Warren County, New York.

References
 USGS-U.S. Board on Geographic Names

Lakes of New York (state)